Amyris is a genus of flowering plants in the citrus family, Rutaceae. The generic name is derived from the Greek word αμ, which means "intensely scented" and refers to the strong odor of the resin. Members of the genus are commonly known as torchwoods because of their highly flammable wood.

Species
, Plants of the World Online accepted the following species:

Amyris abeggii Ekman ex Urb.
Amyris amazonica Cornejo & Kallunki
Amyris apiculata Urb. & Ekman
Amyris attenuata Standl.
Amyris balsamifera L. – balsam torchwood
Amyris barbata Lundell
Amyris brachybotrys Turcz.
Amyris brenesii Standl.
Amyris carterae Rebman & F.Chiang
Amyris centinelensis Cornejo
Amyris chiapensis Lundell
Amyris conzattii Standl.
Amyris cordata I.M.Johnst.
Amyris crebrinervis Gereau
Amyris cubensis (Borhidi & Acuña) Beurton
Amyris diatrypa Spreng. – hairy torchwood
Amyris elemifera L. – sea torchwood 
Amyris filipes Lundell
Amyris granulata Urb.
Amyris guatemalensis Lundell
Amyris guianensis Aubl.
Amyris humboldtii Krug & Urb.
Amyris ignea Steyerm.
Amyris intermedia Urb. & Ekman
Amyris jorgemeavei Hern.-Barón, Espejo, Pérez-García, Cerros & López-Ferr.
Amyris karlitae W.Palacios
Amyris lineata C.Wright ex Griseb.
Amyris lurida Lundell
Amyris macrocarpa Gereau
Amyris madrensis S.Watson – mountain torchwood
Amyris magnifolia Gómez-Laur. & Q.Jiménez
Amyris marshii Standl.
Amyris metopioides Zanoni & M.M.Mejía
Amyris mexicana Lundell
Amyris monophylla Brandegee
Amyris multijuga Turcz.
Amyris oblanceolata A.Pool
Amyris pernambucensis Arruda
Amyris phlebotaenioides Urb. & Ekman
Amyris pinnata Kunth
Amyris plumieri DC.
Amyris polymorpha Urb.
Amyris polyneura Urb.
Amyris pungens Urb.
Amyris purpusii P.Wilson
Amyris rekoi S.F.Blake
Amyris rhomboidea Standl.
Amyris robinsonii DC.
Amyris roseomaculata Hern.-Barón, Cerros, M.González, Espejo & López-Ferr.
Amyris sandemanii Sandwith
Amyris staminosa Lundell
Amyris stromatophylla P.Wilson
Amyris terebinthifolia Ten.
Amyris texana (Buckley) P.Wilson – Texas torchwood, chapotillo
Amyris thyrsiflora Turcz.
Amyris trimera Krug & Urb.
Amyris vestita Lundell

Formerly placed here
 Atalantia simplicifolia (Roxb.) Engl. (as A. simplicifolia Roxb.)
 Boswellia papyrifera (Delile ex Caill.) Hochst. (as A. papyrifera Delile ex Caill.)
 Bursera excelsa (as A. elegans)
 Canarium zeylanicum (Retz.) Blume (as A. zeylanica Retz.)
 Clausena anisata (Willd.) Hook.f. (as A. anisata Willd. or A. dentata Willd.)
 Clausena heptaphylla (Roxb. ex DC.) Wight & Arn. ex Steud.  (as A. heptaphylla Roxb. ex DC.)
 Commiphora gileadensis (L.) C.Chr. (as A. gileadensis L. or A. opobalsamum L.)
 Commiphora kataf (Forssk.) Engl. (as A. kataf Forssk.)
 Metopium toxiferum (L.) Krug & Urb. (as A. toxifera L.)
 Schinus polygama (Cav.) Cabrera (as A. polygama Cav.)

Uses
The trunks of Amyris species exude elemi, a type of balsam (oleoresin) that contains elemic acids, liquid sesquiterpenes, and triterpenes such as α- and β-amyrin among other components. It is used medicinally and in lacquers. The wood is often used for torches and firewood. Its high resin content causes it to burn brightly, and it will burn well even when green. In addition, the wood is hard, heavy, close-grained, can take a high polish, and repels dry wood termites. Essential oils containing caryophyllene, cadinene, and cadinol are extracted from A. balsamifera and A. elemifera. These are used in varnishes, perfumes, medicines, cosmetics, soaps, and incense.

Chemical compounds known as chromenylated amides isolated from Amyris plumieri have shown some inhibition of the cytochrome P450 enzymes.

References

 
Rutaceae genera
Taxonomy articles created by Polbot